Georges Lambert Casimir Nagelmackers (25 June 1845, Liège, Belgium - 10 August 1905, Villepreux, France) was a Belgian civil engineer and businessman, famous for founding the Compagnie Internationale des Wagons-Lits and creating  the Orient Express.

Biography 
Born into a family of bankers with interests in railways and close links to the court of King Leopold II of Belgium, Georges Nagelmackers trained as a civil engineer. As a young man he fell in love with an older cousin.  When his feelings were not reciprocated, his family encouraged him to travel to the United States of America to help him recover and also further his professional studies. He spent ten months travelling throughout America during which time he was exposed to train travel on Pullman carriages. He became convinced that there was a market for Pullman-type carriages in Europe. After a proposal to George Pullman to collaborate on developing the European market was rebuffed, Nagelmackers returned to Europe.

Other versions of his biography maintain that Georges Nagelmackers knew about sleeping cars as they were already in operation in Belgium before he traveled to the United States, and that he never actually met George Pullman.

In 1870 he published a proposal to develop sleeper carriages for the European market called "Projet d'Installation de wagons-lits sur les chemins de fer du continent" (Project for the installation of sleeping cars on the railways of the Continent). However the outbreak of the Franco-Prussian War delayed the granting of a concession from the Belgian government and the establishment of his first sleeper-carriage service.

In 1873 Georges Nagelmackers founded the company Georges Nagelmackers & Company, which later became Compagnie Internationale des Wagons-Lits (CIWL). He headquartered the company in Paris and created the Compagnie Internationale des Grands Hotels to develop and operate luxury hotels along its trains' routes. His strategy consisted of convincing train operators to attach his sleeping and restaurant cars to their trains to diversify train travelers' choices. The first CIWL-only train became operational in 1882.

The Orient Express was launched 4 October 1883. Later, he bought the Mudanya–Bursa line and sold it to the French in 1891. He also bought the Izmir–Kasaba Railway in 1893 and also sold it to the French the following year.

He competed in the equestrian mail coach event at the 1900 Summer Olympics, winning the gold medal.

References

Mustafa Yazıcı, Mudanya-Bursa Demiryolunun Yapımı ve İşletilmesi (1873–1908), Nilüfer Belediyesi, Bursa, 2015,

External links

 

Businesspeople from Liège
1845 births
1905 deaths
Equestrians at the 1900 Summer Olympics
Olympic equestrians of Belgium
Belgian male equestrians
Olympic gold medalists for Belgium
Medalists at the 1900 Summer Olympics
Sportspeople from Liège